Nongsha may refer to:
 Kanglā Shā (Kangla Sha), the guardian dragon lion guarding the Kangla Palace
 Lion, a species of mammals
 Nongshāba (Nongshaba), a son of the supreme deity in Meitei mythology and religion